The EuroBasket Women 2013 final was played at the Pévèle Arena in Orchies, France, on 30 June 2013, between Spain and France.

Road to the final 

|bgcolor=#F7F6A8|First Round
|colspan=2 align=center|

|}
|- valign=top bgcolor=#F7F6A8
|Opponent
|Result
|bgcolor=#F7F6A8|
|Opponent
|Result
|-
|align=left|
|80–44
|bgcolor=#F7F6A8|Game 1
|align=left|
|78–70
|-
|align=left|
|66–50
|bgcolor=#F7F6A8|Game 2
|align=left|
|64–49
|-
|align=left|
|61–48
|bgcolor=#F7F6A8|Game 3
|align=left|
|58–50
|-
|colspan="2" align=center|

|}
|bgcolor=#F7F6A8|Second Round
|colspan=2 align=center|

|}
|- valign=top bgcolor=#F7F6A8
|Opponent
|Result
|bgcolor=#F7F6A8|
|Opponent
|Result
|-
|align=left|
|75–58
|bgcolor=#F7F6A8|Quarterfinals
|align=left|
|87–83
|-
|align=left|
|88–69
|bgcolor=#F7F6A8|Semifinals
|align=left|
|57–49
|}

Match details

References 

final
2012–13 in Spanish women's basketball
2012–13 in French basketball
Spain women's national basketball team games
France women's national basketball team games
2013